Asadollah Azimi (born 25 September 1959 in Mianeh, East Azerbaijan) is a Paralympian athlete from Iran competing mainly in category F53 throwing events.

References

 The medal presentation ceremony in Rio 2016
 Video of receive the medal

External links 
 

Paralympic athletes of Iran
Athletes (track and field) at the 2004 Summer Paralympics
Athletes (track and field) at the 2016 Summer Paralympics
Paralympic bronze medalists for Iran
Living people
Medalists at the 2016 Summer Paralympics
People from Mianeh
1959 births
Paralympic medalists in athletics (track and field)
Iranian male shot putters
Wheelchair shot putters
Paralympic shot putters
Medalists at the 2018 Asian Para Games